Suvorove is an urban-type settlement in Izmail Raion of Odesa Oblast in Ukraine. It is located at the norther end of Lake Katlabuh in the river delta of the Danube. Suvorove hosts the administration of Suvorove settlement hromada, one of the hromadas of Ukraine. Population:

History 
Following the electronic vote of the settlement population, the settlement council voted on 26 December 2022 to rename Suvorove to Bessarabske.

Economy

Transportation
Suvorove is close to the railway connecting Izmail and Artsyz with the further connection to Odesa. There is infrequent passenger traffic.

The settlement has access to Highway M15 connecting Odessa with Reni via Ismail and further crossing into Moldova and Romania.

References

Izmail Raion
Urban-type settlements in Izmail Raion